This is a list of active and dormant volcanoes.

References

 01
French Southern and Antarctic Lands
Geography of the French Southern and Antarctic Lands